Deso, DeSo, or DESO may refer to:
 DeSo, a social media-oriented blockchain created in 2021
 $DESO, the native cryptocurrency of the DeSo blockchain
 Designated driver, in Australian slang
 UK Defence and Security Exports, a British arms export organization formerly known as "Defence Export Services Organisation"
 Deso Kalvin, a cricket player from Seychelles
 RKVV DESO, a Dutch football club
 An acronym for "direct effect of social origins", in Social mobility
 Departmental Entry Subordinate Officers, a kind of assistant commandant in India
 Deso, a player in the Serbian football club FK Vojvodina; see List of FK Vojvodina players
 Any drug whose name begins with "deso"; see List of drugs: De#deso-desy

See also 

 Deso Dogg (1975–2018), a German rapper and jihadist
 Desso Sports, a company that created the GrassMaster brand of sports playing fields
 Diso, a town in Italy
 Daeso (60 BC–20 AD), the last king of the Korean kingdom of Dongbuyeo